Chi Pang-yuan (born 19 February 1924) is a writer, academic, and Chinese–English translator. She has been instrumental in introducing Taiwanese literature to the western world through translations. She is currently professor emeritus of English and comparative literature at National Taiwan University.

Her autobiography, The Great Flowing River, is a bestseller in the Sinophone world. It has been translated in English.

References

1924 births
Living people
National Wuhan University alumni
Indiana University alumni
Academic staff of the National Taiwan University
Academic staff of the National Chung Hsing University
People from Tieling
Writers from Liaoning
Chinese–English translators
English–Chinese translators
Saint Mary-of-the-Woods College faculty
Literary translators
Taiwanese people from Liaoning
Fulbright alumni